Berberis flexuosa  is a shrub in the Berberidaceae described as a species in 1802. It is endemic to Peru.

References

Endemic flora of Peru
flexuosa
Plants described in 1802